Sengar, also known as Sanghar, Singraur or Songar, are a clan of Rajputs in India.

History

The central Indian state Madhya Pradesh was the location of battles and lesser-known rule of the Sengar Rajputs. In the eleventh century CE, they migrated from Jalaun to the fertile area of Rewa district known as Mauganj. They constructed garhis (forts) in Mauganj, Nai Garhi, Mangawan, and Bichhrata that was historically known as 'Mau Raj'. This kingdom battled and survived the invasion of the Kalachuris until the Baghelas arrived in the region in the fourteenth century and defeated the Sengars. They destroyed the fort in Mau and forced them to disperse. The region was named Baghelkhand and Rewa became the capital of Baghelas.

Accordingly, Sengars were the descendants of the sage Rishyasringa  who was the son-in-law of Dasharatha, married to his daughter Shanta and performed a "putrajeshthi" yagya after which Lord Rama was born. Rishyasringa had two sons, from one son Gautam vansh was descended and from the other son Sengar vansh was descended. Shringverpur was the penitential (Tapobhumi) place of Rishyasringa which is now known to be as singraur . Singraur word is also mentioned in ramchatritra Manas. Sengar kshtriya of that time formed an organisation named as singraur with a collaboration of sengar and Ror's of haryana and Rajasthan to fought against khalifas, that organisation of kshtriya clan of sengars are called singraur. Mostly sengar were the large in numbers. During the mughals era fighting to mughals the sengars escaped from the place shrinverpur to the near by places like prayagraj, kaushambi, fatehpur , rewa , gharwal etc. And adopted the place or organization name to denote their bravery and title as well , therefore Sengar of these region were known as singraur . And place shringverpur were also known to be singraur since 8 century AD

The disgruntled Sengars migrated to Naigarhi and constructed a fort that was more robust than their fort in Mau. The rising influence of Baghelas due to their amity with the Mughals made them a strong opponent. The Sengars of Naigarhi took control of 107 villages and 36 thakurs of this clan were appointed in the villages Gangeo, Pahari, and Jodhpur. In 1882, the British forced the Thakur of Naigarhi to attend Dussehera ceremonies in Rewa and once he paid his dues he was granted back his estate.

Sironj (is a town and a municipality in Vidisha district in Madhya Pradesh) its surroundings were ruled by the Sengar Rajputs in the beginning of the 12th century. Shankar Singh, a Sengar Rajput king, had occupied the town of Sironj in about A. D. 1103 He is also said to have developed this place, that was known as "Sengraj"( which means Sengar-Raj ) After which this name got spoiled and became Sironj.

The area of Lateri in present-day Madhya Pradesh was once ruled by the Sengars, whose livelihood was derived primarily from looting and plundering, and was reflected in the name of their capital, Looteri. In what is now Uttar Pradesh, the principal town of the Lakhnesar Pargana during the mediaeval period was Rasra. When the Sengars opposed British activities in 1812, Colonel Martindell came with a troop of sepoys to quell them. The Sengars attacked the marching sepoys on Great Deccan Road and several were killed. The Sengars then plundered the area. Siddiqui considers this act of attacking British forces to be a part of the movement for the independence of India.

The Sengars' reputation as warriors originated in the Lodi era, when they safeguarded their territories against the Delhi Sultanate and fought Babur. They remained an important population segment when land reforms were carried out by Akbar in the Indo-Gangetic Plain of northern India. They fought the British while maintaining their land rights and territorial regime in areas of Lakhnesar and Baliya in the nineteenth century.

In the eighteenth and early nineteenth centuries, the Sengars were among the communities that practised female infanticide, in Bundelkhand, an area that is now split between Uttar Pradesh and Madhya Pradesh.

Notables
Kuldeep Singh Sengar, former Member of the legislative assembly from Uttar Pradesh.
 Kratika Sengar, television actress from Kanpur, Uttar Pradesh.

References 

Madhya Pradesh District Gazetteers: Vidisha http://indianculture.gov.in/gazettes/madhya-pradesh-district-gazetteers-vidisha

Further reading

 

Rajput clans of Bihar
Rajput clans of Uttar Pradesh
Rajput clans of Madhya Pradesh